David Attan (born 15 December 1948) is a Kenyan boxer. He competed in the men's light middleweight event at the 1972 Summer Olympics.

References

External links
 

1948 births
Living people
Kenyan male boxers
Olympic boxers of Kenya
Boxers at the 1972 Summer Olympics
Boxers at the 1970 British Commonwealth Games
Commonwealth Games bronze medallists for Kenya
Commonwealth Games medallists in boxing
Place of birth missing (living people)
Light-middleweight boxers
21st-century Kenyan people
20th-century Kenyan people
Medallists at the 1970 British Commonwealth Games